Anteo (A 5309) is a submarine rescue ship of the Italian Navy, assigned to Raggruppamento Subacquei ed Incursori "Teseo Tesei" (COMSUBIN). Anteo is the third ship to bear this name in the Italian Navy. The ship's design was developed by the "Ufficio Navi Speciali del Reparto Progetti Navi" (Special Office of the Ships Projects Division), according to the guidelines provided by the Navy General Staff. The ship was built at Cantiere Navale Breda di Porto Marghera and commissioned to the Italian Navy on 31 July 1980.

Characteristics 

It is fitted with:
SDC system for submarine rescue up to 250 m deep
SRC Submarine Rescue Chamber: Mc-Cann rescue bell, for submarine rescue up to 120 m deep; height: 4 m, diameter: 2,20 m, displacement 9,5 tonnes, 6 survivors per cycle;
DRASS Galeazzi SRV-300 deep-submergence rescue vehicle for submarine rescue up to 300 m deep; 12 survivors per cycle; length overall 8.46 m, width overall 3.13 m, height (without skirt) 3.17 m, displacement 27.3 tonnes (since 1980 and until 2002 was used Breda MSM-1S USEL deep-submergence rescue vehicle);
3 x hardsuit atmospheric diving suit (ADS) systems of Oceanworks International for submarine rescue up to 300 m deep
1 x SAAB Seaeye Falcon ROV
1 x Gaymarine Pluto ROV
1 x hull mounted Konsberg Simrad EM 1002 multi beam sonar
1 x DRASS Galeazzi compression chamber for 12 persons
2 x DRASS Galeazzi compression chambers for 6 and 3 persons

See also 
deep-submergence rescue vehicle DRASS Galeazzi SRV-300 
deep-submergence rescue vehicle Breda MSM-1S USEL 
COMSUBIN
Italian ship USSP

References

External links
 Anteo (A 5309) Marina Militare website

Auxiliary ships of the Italian Navy
1978 ships
Submarine rescue ships
Ships built by Fincantieri
Ships built in Venice